Pacaraos District is one of twelve districts of the province Huaral in Peru.

Until the middle of the 20th century, the inhabitants of the village of Pacaraos spoke Pacaraos Quechua.

See also 
 Challwaqucha
 Pirwa Hirka
 Yana Uqhu

References